The Khatuq or Adale were a Circassian tribe that lived on the Taman Peninsula until it was occupied by Russian troops during the Russo-Circassian War, following which, the tribe was annihilated in the Circassian genocide.

History 
During the Russo-Circassian War, after their land was occupied, the surviving Khatuq tribespeople migrated to Natukhaj. During the Circassian genocide, as the Natukhaj were exterminated, most of those survivors were killed. A small portion of them fled to Turkey, where they were assimilated into Turks or other tribes.

Mentions 
In 1773, German explorer Johann Anton Güldenstädt reported about the Khatuq. After the end of the Russo-Circassian War in 1871, Russian historian and academician Lieutenant General N.F. Dubrovin wrote:

" ... Among the Natukhaj people lived three other Adyghe tribes, who were destroyed and merged: Chebsin, Khegayk, and Khatuq or Adale, who lived on the Taman peninsula, and now scattered in different places among the Natukhaj people ..."

References 

Circassian tribes
History of Kuban
Historical ethnic groups of Russia
Adygea